Pseudandriasa is a monotypic moth genus in the family Sphingidae erected by Robert Herbert Carcasson in 1968. Its only species, Pseudandriasa mutata, described by Francis Walker in 1855, is known from KwaZulu-Natal in South Africa.

References

External links

Endemic moths of South Africa
Smerinthini
Monotypic moth genera
Moths of Africa
Taxa named by Robert Herbert Carcasson